The Cooters are an American rock band from  Oxford, Mississippi. Based out of the northern hill country town of Oxford (home of Ole Miss), the band has been touring and recording since 1993. The Cooters are well known in the region. While recording albums, embarking on tours, and winning awards, The Cooters have also dealt with controversy, trademark lawsuits, and even prison sentences.

The Cooters have released albums and records on Minneapolis, Minnesota record label Profane Existence, as well as Grammy-Nominated label T-Bones Records. The Cooters have released much of their music themselves.

The Cooters are critically acclaimed, and their music has been described as a "mix of punk and metal with an interesting Southern flavor" by fans, while their lyrics tackle social and political topics, usually in a humorous tongue-in-cheek manner.

The Cooters have toured across the United States, playing with bands such as Nashville Pussy, Jucifer, Blue Mountain, From Ashes Rise, Total Chaos, Bad Company, Seven Mary Three, Destroy!, Before I Hang, The Neckbones, Misery, and Wartorn.  In 2006, The Cooters toured extensively with the Swedish band Imperial Leather and the Oregon band Happy Bastards, who also toured with The Cooters in 2008.

On March 27, 2014, The Cooters were the subject of the Mississippi Public Broadcasting television show, "Oxford Sounds," along with Mississippi guitarist George McConnell, former member of Beanland and Widespread Panic. The TV show was broadcast statewide on public television. The Cooters performed five songs on the show, including "Let's Rock Tonight," "Bustin' Loose," "Dare To Defy," "Take A Stand," and "Fall Apart." Cooters vocalist and bassist Newt Rayburn was interviewed by George McConnell.

The Cooters celebrated their 20th Anniversary with drummer Mike Namorato on November 21, 2014, at Proud Larrys' in Oxford, Mississippi. Other bands on the bill included Before I Hang and The Heard.

Line-up
 Newt Rayburn - bass and vocals
 Gentry Webb - guitar and vocals
 Mikey Namorato - drums

Former members and collaborators:
 Brad Boatright - guitar and vocals, also of From Ashes Rise
 Max Hipp - guitar and vocals, also of E*Meters, Kill The Ego, Morphist, Kincain, The Apostles 
 Tom Queyja - vocals and production, also of Fuzzy Crystals, Wobitty, New Madrid Click, Dead Fish, BMAO
 Tyler Keith - drums, also of The Neckbones, Preacher's Kids, The Apostles, Kid Twist
 Jeff Allen - guitar and personality, also of Plaid Etude
 Jeff Lawrence - percussionist
 Robert Freeland - Moog
 Chris Robertson - vocals, saxophone, also of Nightmare On Sesame Street, Big K Cola

Timeline
<div style="float:left;">

Discography

Official releases

7" vinyl
 The Cooters (1995) 7" "The South Will Burn Again"b/w "I Don't Know" - Assault With Intent To Free Records
 "Bustin' Loose" b/w "The Gooch" (2005) 7" Profane Existence Records
 Happy Bastards and The Cooters (2008) 7" Profane Existence Records

Albums
 Grisham's Army (1995) Cooters Records
 Invasion of The Cooters (1996) Cooters Records
 The Moon Will Rise Again (1998/2002) T-Bones Records
 Live at Larrys''' (2000) Cooters Records
 Punk Metal (2004) Profane Existence Records
 Chaos or Bust (2006) Profane Existence Records
 Live and Loud at the Longshot (2007) Cooters Records
 Sound & The Fury (2011) Cooters Records
 Oxford Sounds (2014) Mississippi Public Broadcasting

Singles and Downloads
 "I Like Sex" (1994/1995)
 "Crusty" (1994/2004) aka "Freedom's Anthem"
 "The Gooch" (1995/2004) 
 "Wheels In Motion" (1995/2004) 
 "Breaking The Law" (1995) 
 "Life Like" (1997/2004) 
 "Punch Yer Neighbor"( 1994/1998)
 "Cooters Theme" (1994/1998) 
 "Cootersaurus" (1998)
 "Purge" (1991/1998) and  "Purge Reprise" (1993/1998)
 "Dare To Defy" (1998)
 "Soul Food" (1998) 
 "Society Sets The Stereotype" (1988/2003)
 "Carpetbaggers" (1999)
 "Cosmo Demonic" (2000)
 "Sexy Daunter" (2000) 
 "Juggernaut" (2000)
 "Sun God" (2000) 
 "Kill Them With Kindness" (1995/2004)
 "Drama Mama" (2002)
 "Woo Lord!" (2003) 
 "Bustin' Loose" (2005/2014)
 "Waffle House Rock" (2005)
 "Crapple Pie" (2005)
 "Reign Lunacy" (2005)
 "Let's Rock Tonight" (2006/2014)
 "Put Your Dukes Up" (2008)
"I Don't Give A Fuck" (2011)
"Same Shit Different Pile" (2011)
 "Fall Apart" (2011/2014)
 "Take A Stand" (2011/2014)
 "You're Hooked" (2011)

Compilations
 Terrible Rotten Things That Happen to Kids (1995) CD on Kathode Ray
 Oasis Alternative (1997) CD on Oasis Discs
 Oasis Alternative (2003) CD on Oasis Discs
 Your Soundtrack on the Road to Hell (2007) Profane Existence Records
 Profane Existence No. 54 Compilation CD (2007) Profane Existence Records
 Profane Existence No. 55 Compilation CD (2008) Profane Existence Records
 Profane Existence No. 56 Compilation CD (2008) Profane Existence Records
 Profane Existence No. 57 Compilation CD (2008) Profane Existence Records
 Songs of Freedom: Live and Let Rock (2011) Invisible Hand Painted Red
 Songs of Freedom 3 (2012) Invisible Hand Painted Red
 Songs of Freedom: Bayou Bootleg (2012) Invisible Hand Painted Red
 Songs of Freedom: Rock Anthology (2012) Invisible Hand Painted Red

References

External links
The Cooters Official webpage
[ The Cooters info at AllMusic.com]

American punk rock groups
Crossover thrash groups
Rock music groups from Mississippi